Bloch is a German television series.

See also
List of German television series

External links
 

German drama television series
German crime television series
2002 German television series debuts
2013 German television series endings
German-language television shows
Das Erste original programming
Psychotherapy in fiction